Canada is an unincorporated community in Pike County, Kentucky.

There are two possible scenarios for the origin of the name "Canada". One possible explanation being that Canada (or “kanata”) is the Huron-Iroquois word for settlement, since the area once had a large population of Native Americans. The other explanation involves Zebulon Pike, a general in the War of 1812 who most of Pike County is named after. Pike died in Canada, which leads to this being a possible origin of the name "Canada".

References

Unincorporated communities in Pike County, Kentucky
Unincorporated communities in Kentucky